The longbill spearfish (Tetrapturus pfluegeri) is a species of marlin native to the Atlantic Ocean where it is found above the thermocline in open waters between 40°N and 35°S. This species can reach a length of  FL and the maximum weight recorded is . It feeds on pelagic fishes such as needlefish, tuna, and jack, as well as squids. They spawn once a year. The specific name honours the Florida game fisherman and taxidermist Albert Pflueger Sr, who died in 1962.

Description
The longbill spearfish is a blueish black color from above, and silvery-white and brown on the sides. The pectorals are blackish-brown and the dorsal fins are dark blue.

References

 

Fish of the Atlantic Ocean
Fish of the Dominican Republic
Tetrapturus
Fish described in 1963